Judeo-Tripolitanian Arabic (also known as Tripolitanian Judeo-Arabic, Jewish Tripolitanian-Libyan Arabic, Tripolita'it, Yudi) is a variety of Arabic spoken by Jews formerly living in Libya. Judeo-Tripolitanian Arabic differs from standard Libyan Arabic in that it closely resembles the original dialect of the sedentary population, whereas much of Libya's population now speaks Bedouin-influenced varieties of Arabic. A reference grammar is available.

The vast majority of Libyan Jews have relocated to Israel and have switched to using Hebrew in as their home language. Those in Italy typically use Italian as their first language.

Demographics
In ca. 1994 there were 35,000 speakers of Judeo-Tripolitanian Arabic, mostly in Israel (30,000) and Italy (5,000). As of 2014, those in Israel are mostly over the age of 60 and are bilingual in Hebrew.

History
There were 20,000 Jews living in Tripoli, Libya in 1948. About 14,000 migrated to Israel and Italy in 1948-1952, following two riots. After riots during the Six-Day War in 1967, most of the remaining 6,000 Jews emigrated; there were only a few dozen Jews living in Tripoli in 1970.

See also
History of the Jews in Libya
Jewish languages
Judeo-Arabic languages

References

Further reading

Goldberg, H. (1983) Language and culture of the Jews of Tripolitania. Mediterranean language review 1. (?).
Spolsky, B. (2014). The languages of the Jews: A sociolinguistic history.

External links
Judeo-Arabic at endangeredlanguages.com

Endangered Afroasiatic languages
Jews and Judaism in Libya
Judeo-Arabic languages
Languages of Israel